Harold Acker Horn (May 10, 1924 – December 31, 1985) is a former Republican member of the Pennsylvania House of Representatives.
 He was born in Gap, Pennsylvania to Albert M. and Lavinia M. Acker Horn.

Harold Horn died December 31, 1985.

References

Republican Party members of the Pennsylvania House of Representatives
1985 deaths
1924 births
20th-century American politicians